Valentin Nouma (born 14 February 2000) is a Burkinabé footballer who currently plays as a defender for Rahimo.

Career statistics

International

References

2000 births
Living people
Burkinabé footballers
Burkina Faso international footballers
Association football defenders
Rahimo FC players
Burkinabé Premier League players
21st-century Burkinabé people
Burkina Faso A' international footballers
2018 African Nations Championship players